The NCAC men's basketball tournament is the annual conference basketball championship tournament for the NCAA Division III North Coast Athletic Conference. The tournament has been held annually since 1985. It is a single-elimination tournament and seeding is based on regular season records.

The winner, declared conference champion, receives the NCAC's automatic bid to the NCAA Men's Division III Basketball Championship.

With 15 titles, Wooster are the most successful team.

Results

Championship records

 Schools highlighted in pink are former NCAC members.
 Hiram and Oberlin have yet to advance to a tournament final.
 Case Western and Earlham never qualified for the tournament finals as conference members.

References

NCAA Division III men's basketball conference tournaments
Basketball Tournament, Men's
Recurring sporting events established in 1997